Carl Otto Czeschka (22 October 1878, Vienna – 30 July, 1960, Hamburg) was an Austrian painter and graphic designer associated with the Wiener Werkstätte.

Life 

Carl Otto Czeschka was half Bohemian and half Moravian origin. His father Wenzel Czeschka (Vaclav Češka, 1845–1915) was a master carpenter; and his mother Mathilde Hafner (1853–1883), working as a seamstress and embroiderer. Carl Otto Czeschka raised in Vienna under very poor background. He lived in the Zinckgasse 6, Rudolfsheim-Fünfhaus. He  worked intensely as a designer and book illustrator, making designs for many books, leaflets, programs, placards, etc. He was a friend of Gustav Klimt.

His best known book is an art edition of the German tale "The Nibelungs" (Die Nibelungen), full in the Sezesion style that was predominant at his time.

Further reading 
 Stasny, Peter. "Czeschka, Carl Otto." In Grove Art Online. Oxford Art Online, (accessed January 9, 2012; subscription required).

External links 

 
 Entry for Carl Otto Czeschka on the Union List of Artist Names

References 

1878 births
1960 deaths
19th-century Austrian painters
19th-century German male artists
Austrian male painters
20th-century Austrian painters
Wiener Werkstätte
Austrian people of Czech descent
Austrian emigrants to Germany
People from Rudolfsheim-Fünfhaus
Artists from Hamburg
Academic staff of the University of Fine Arts of Hamburg
20th-century Austrian male artists